Juan Ramón Garrido Meza (born 12 September 1963) is a Chilean former professional footballer who played as a forward for clubs in Chile, Mexico and Colombia.

Club career
Garrido had an extensive career in Chilean football. He began his career with Santiago Morning, making his debut at the age of 16. In his first season in the top division, he made four appearances.

A well remembered player of Palestino, in his first stint with the club, he got promotion to the top division in the 1989 season, scoring twenty goals. 

He played abroad between 1990 and 1991 for both Tecos in Mexico and Independiente Santa Fe in Colombia. In Santa Fe, he coincided with his compatriot Carlos Molina and they became the first Chileans who have played for the club before Luis Ceballos, Mauricio Illesca and Julio Gutiérrez.

His last club was Unión San Felipe in the 1994 season.

International career
Garrido represented Chile at under-20 level in the 1983 South American Championship. Previously, he took part of another youth national teams alongside players such as Ivo Basay, Jorge Muñoz and Luis Pérez.

At senior level, he made two appearances in 1990. Both matches were 0–0 draws against Brazil in the Copa Expedito Teixeira.

Honours
Chile
 Copa Expedito Teixeira: 1990

References

External links
 
 Juan Ramón Garrido at Sport.de 
 Juan Ramón Garrido at PartidosdeLaRoja.com 

1963 births
Living people
Footballers from Santiago
Chilean footballers
Chilean expatriate footballers
Chile under-20 international footballers
Chile youth international footballers
Chile international footballers
Santiago Morning footballers
Deportes Concepción (Chile) footballers
Ñublense footballers
Deportes Valdivia footballers
Curicó Unido footballers
Deportes Linares footballers
C.D. Antofagasta footballers
Club Deportivo Palestino footballers
Tecos F.C. footballers
Independiente Santa Fe footballers
Unión San Felipe footballers
Deportes Temuco footballers
Chilean Primera División players
Primera B de Chile players
Tercera División de Chile players
Liga MX players
Categoría Primera A players
Chilean expatriate sportspeople in Mexico
Expatriate footballers in Mexico
Chilean expatriate sportspeople in Colombia
Expatriate footballers in Colombia
Association football forwards